2011 Indonesia Super League All-Star Game (in Indonesian: ISL Perang Bintang 2011) is the annual football All-star game in Indonesia, which was held shortly after the end of 2010–11 Indonesia Super League. This is the closing event for the Indonesia Super League's 2010-11 season.

Football fans can vote for the players to be included in the ISL All-Star team. The other spot will be automatically taken by the 2010–11 Indonesia Super League champions, Persipura Jayapura. Obviously, the ISL All-star team will not be composed of any player from Persipura.

The 2010-11 season's MVP award and top-scorer award (both given to Boaz Solossa) and the ISL Champions' trophy (to Persipura Jayapura) were awarded by PSSI (Indonesia's FA) during a ceremony after the All-Star game.

ISL All-Star squad

Staff
Head coach :  Nil Maizar (Semen Padang)

Players

|-----
! colspan="11" bgcolor="#B0D3FB" align="left" |
|----- bgcolor="#DFEDFD"

|-----
! colspan="11" bgcolor="#B0D3FB" align="left" |
|----- bgcolor="#DFEDFD"

|-----
! colspan="11" bgcolor="#B0D3FB" align="left" |
|----- bgcolor="#DFEDFD"

ISL All-Star game

See also
 2010–11 Indonesia Super League

References

External links
Official Website

2010-11
All